East Kapolei is a census-designated place (CDP) in Honolulu County, Hawaii, United States. It is on the south side of the island of Oahu and is bordered to the west by Kapolei, to the south by Ewa Villages, to the east by West Loch Estate, and to the north by Interstate H-1.

East Kapolei was first listed as a CDP prior to the 2020 census.

Demographics

References 

Census-designated places in Honolulu County, Hawaii
Census-designated places in Hawaii